Westella is a genus of green algae in the family Scenedesmaceae.

References

Sphaeropleales genera
Sphaeropleales